Bradi Wall (born December 16, 1991, in Swift Current, Saskatchewan) is a Canadian baseball player. She is a member of the Canada women's national baseball team which won a silver medal at the 2015 Pan American Games.

Playing career

NCAA
In 2010 and 2011, Wall was a member of the softball team at Iowa Western Community College. Wall competed in softball for two seasons with the University of Iowa Hawkeyes. Playing at second base, she started 106 of 107 games in her NCAA career.

Baseball
She has competed with the Canadian national team in two then–IBAF Women's World Cups (2012, 2014), earning the bronze medal in 2012.

In 2014, she competed with Team Alberta, winning a gold medal at the Senior Women's Invitational National Championships in Canada.

Awards and honours
 2011 Louisville Slugger NJCAA DI All-Region first team
 2011 NFCA All-America first team
 2011 NJCAA All-America second team honors
 2012 Jimmy Rattlesnake Award
 2013 Academic All-Big Ten Selection

Personal
She graduated from the University of Iowa in 2013. Her father Ken Wall was a competitive wrestler at the University of Saskatchewan.

References

1991 births
Baseball people from Saskatchewan
Baseball players at the 2015 Pan American Games
Canadian female baseball players
Living people
People from Swift Current
Pan American Games silver medalists for Canada
Pan American Games medalists in baseball
Medalists at the 2015 Pan American Games